Falo may refer to:

Falo Alliance
Falo, Mali

See also
 Faló, the main character in the Swedish comic strip Uti vår hage (comic strip)